Vinh Long Harry Willemin (born 8 January 1982) is a French former professional footballer who played as a defender.

Career
In 2003, Willemin signed for Louhans-Cuiseaux in the French fourth division from French Ligue 1 side Metz.

Before the second half of the 2005–06 season, he signed for SC Hauenstein in the German fourth division from 2. Bundesliga club 1. FC Saarbrücken.

Before the second half of the 2006–07 season, he signed for Viterbese in the Italian third division before joining Luxembourgish team Racing Union Luxembourg.

In 2007, Willemin applied to represent Vietnam internationally.

References

External links
 

Living people
1982 births
French footballers
Association football defenders
French people of Vietnamese descent
Ligue 1 players
Serie C players
2. Bundesliga players
FC Metz players
A.C. Ancona players
Louhans-Cuiseaux FC players
SC Hauenstein players
1. FC Saarbrücken players
French expatriate footballers
French expatriate sportspeople in Germany
Expatriate footballers in Germany
French expatriate sportspeople in Italy
Expatriate footballers in Italy
French expatriate sportspeople in Luxembourg
Expatriate footballers in Luxembourg